Superman/Batman: Apocalypse is a 2010 American animated superhero film based on the Superman/Batman comic book storyline "The Supergirl from Krypton" and is a standalone sequel to Superman/Batman: Public Enemies. The art style is partly based on that of Michael Turner, who penciled the Superman/Batman comic book arc. Released on September 28, 2010, by Warner Premiere and Warner Bros. Animation, it is the ninth film of the DC Universe Animated Original Movies. The film stars Andre Braugher, Kevin Conroy, Tim Daly and Summer Glau. Despite the title, the film focuses primarily on Supergirl and Superman, with Batman playing a supporting role.

The two-disc special edition and Blu-ray also includes an animated short featuring Green Arrow.

Plot
Weeks after the events that led to Lex Luthor's arrest, the impeachment of his presidency, and Superman and Batman's success in saving the world from a kryptonite meteor, a spaceship crash-lands in Gotham City Harbor. While Batman investigates the sunken craft, a young girl emerges from the water and accidentally wrecks Batman's boat. She is naked and has no knowledge of Earth languages or customs. On the shore, she encounters three longshoremen, one of whom tries to advance on her. She attacks two of them out of self-defense, while the third one gives her his coat to cover herself. As the girl progresses into the city, she inadvertently wreaks havoc with her strong Kryptonian powers (with Batman in pursuit) until Superman arrives to correct the damage, allowing Batman to eventually expose her to a piece of Kryptonite which weakens and injures her mentally.

With Superman's help, they discover the girl is Kara Zor-El, the niece of the late Jor-El and Lara, making her Superman's biological first cousin. She has been in suspended animation for decades due to her rocket crashing off course, resulting in Kara being physically younger than her younger cousin. While Superman welcomes Kara, teaches her English, and helps her adjust to Earth's society, Batman remains suspicious, even considering the possibility of Kara being an enemy. Kara states that she would never hurt her baby cousin. Tipped off by Batman, Wonder Woman and Lyla ambush Kara and Clark Kent, Superman's alter ego, in a park and suggest they train Kara at Themyscira, the only place where she can learn how to control her powers. Superman reluctantly agrees to let them train Kara, but still prefers to watch over her himself; however, Batman and Wonder Woman advise Superman to steer clear of Kara, criticizing his care of her.

On the desolate planet Apokolips, Darkseid learns of Kara's presence on Earth and orders Granny Goodness to have her brought to Apokolips as a possible leader for the Female Furies, as Big Barda is no longer his servant and the warrior Treasure being a failed candidate. Two months later, Batman and Superman are checking on Kara on Themyscira during a sparring match against Artemis. When Kara and Lyla sneak away for a swim, a horde of Doomsday clones arrives from Apokolips. Superman, Batman, Wonder Woman, and the Amazonian army fight them until Superman vaporizes them all with his heat vision. Batman, however, guesses the reason for the clones' attack and discovers Kara missing and Lyla dead; a last manifestation of her precognition reveals that the culprit is none other than Darkseid, who ordered a diversion to keep them busy allowing time for Granny to kidnap Kara. Once Kara is brought to Apokolips, Darkseid begins the process of brainwashing her. After he is finished, Kara turns cold-hearted and bloodthirsty, begins serving Darkseid and becomes the captain of his honor guard.

Batman, Superman and Wonder Woman ask Big Barda to help them find their way to Apokolips and despite initially refusing, she agrees. There, Superman infiltrates Darkseid's palace while Wonder Woman and Barda go through the sewers directly into the fighting arena, where Granny Goodness and the Female Furies ambush them. After a hard fight, Granny and the Furies are subdued. Separating himself from the others, Batman finds Darkseid's supply of Hell Spores, the source of the fire pits on Apokolips. Superman encounters Darkseid and discovers the brainwashed Kara. When he tries to bring her back to Earth, Kara refuses to go with him and upon attacking him, Darkseid orders her to kill Superman. Darkseid watches them fight until Batman confronts Darkseid and informs him that he has activated the Hell Spores, which will destroy Apokolips. He issues Darkseid an ultimatum: free Kara and promise to leave her alone, and Batman will deactivate the Spores. Superman defeats Kara, and Barda and Wonder Woman present Darkseid with the subdued Granny, whereupon Darkseid finally releases Kara, and the heroes leave Apokolips, bringing Kara back to Themyscira.

Back on Earth, with their lives apparently normal again, Clark takes Kara to meet his adoptive parents in Smallville. However, Darkseid, who was waiting to kill Superman, ambushes them; he had promised to leave Kara alone, but not Superman or Earth. Darkseid almost kills Superman with his Omega Beams before Kara takes the blast for her cousin. Superman attempts to fight Darkseid, but is quickly overwhelmed and punched into space. Kara engages Darkseid in a lengthy battle and manages to hold her own, having received Amazonian and Apokoliptan training, but he eventually gains the upper hand and knocks her into unconsciousness. Before Darkseid can leave, Superman returns to Earth and reengages him, pounding the villain with all of his strength, but Darkseid still does not relent and again overwhelms Superman with his Omega Beams. Kara recovers and uses Darkseid's Mother Box to activate a Boom Tube behind him, and Superman blasts Darkseid through with his heat vision. While Superman anticipates Darkseid's eventual return from Apokolips, Kara informs him that she changed the coordinates, leaving Darkseid frozen in space.

Having saved her cousin's life and found her place on Earth, Kara decides to use her powers to fight for altruism; under the alias of Supergirl, and she is met with applause by Wonder Woman, the Amazons, and finally Batman. Superman and Supergirl fly to Metropolis together.

Cast
 Kevin Conroy as Bruce Wayne / Batman
 Tim Daly as Kal-El/Clark Kent / Superman
 Summer Glau as Kara Zor-El / Supergirl
 Andre Braugher as Uxas / Darkseid  
 Susan Eisenberg as  Diana Prince / Wonder Woman
 Julianne Grossman as Big Barda
 Ed Asner as Granny Goodness
 Rachel Quaintance as Harbinger / Lyla Michaels, Artemis (uncredited)
 Salli Saffioti as Gilotina, Mad Harriet (uncredited)
 Andrea Romano as Stompa, News Anchor Vicki Vale (uncredited)
 Jim Ward as Radio DJ, Cop (uncredited)
 Dave B. Mitchell as Bearded Longshoreman
 Greg Alan Williams as Terrified Longshoreman
 John Cygan as Male Radio Caller, Gus (uncredited)
 April Winchell as Female Radio Caller 1, Treasure (uncredited)
 Tara Strong as Female Radio Caller 2, Lashina (uncredited)

Notably, Daly, Conroy, Eisenberg and Asner all reprise their respective roles of Superman, Batman, Wonder Woman, and Granny Goodness from the DC Animated Universe.

Reception
The World's Finest said that it was "not something I'll be coming back to any time soon," and specifically targeted Andre Braugher's performance of Darkseid as lacking in any presence. Batman-on-Film gave the film a D, the lowest grade they have given to a DC animated film.

IGN gave the film a positive review with a score of 8 out of 10. The reviewer forgives the misleading title, recognising the story is all about "Supergirl of Krypton" and once you know what you're in for the story is not bad. Glau is praised for giving depth to what could have come across as a whiny beautiful teenager girl, and her story is a complete journey but unfortunately the other characters are not given much to do.

The film earned $6,370,838 from domestic DVD sales and $1,883,591 from domestic Blu-ray sales, bringing its total domestic home video earnings to $8,254,429.

The Blu-ray presentation received an overall score of 8 out of 10 from IGN.

References

External links

DC page

Superman/Batman: Apocalypse at The World's Finest

 

2010s animated superhero films
DC Universe Animated Original Movies
Animated Batman films
Animated Superman films
Direct-to-video sequel films
2010 animated films
2010 films
Films based on works by Jeph Loeb
Films set on islands
2010 direct-to-video films
2010s American animated films
2010s direct-to-video animated superhero films
Films directed by Lauren Montgomery
Films with screenplays by Tab Murphy
Warner Bros. Animation animated films
Warner Bros. direct-to-video animated films
Animated superhero films
Animated science fiction films
2010 science fiction films
Films scored by John Paesano
2010s English-language films